Kaukura Airport  is an airport on Kaukura Atoll in French Polynesia. The airport is about 700 meters northwest of the village of Raitahiti on the islet of Tuteva, which is located at the northwest corner of the atoll.

Airlines and destinations
No scheduled flight as of May 2019.

See also
List of airports in French Polynesia

References

External links
 Atoll list (in French)
 Classification of the French Polynesian atolls by Salvat (1985)

Airports in French Polynesia
Atolls of the Tuamotus